Marcovefa (6th-century – fl. 561) was a Frankish queen consort by marriage to King Charibert I.

Biography 
She was the daughter of a wool carder from the royal palace, according to Grégoire de Tours. She and her sister Merofleda both became married to the King of Paris. This marriage aroused the indignation of Queen Ingoberga who was already married to the King. When Charibert repudiated Ingoberga to marry the two sisters, a scandal resulted and he was excommunicated by the Church. This forced him to eventually divorce the sisters and take Ingoberga back.

Still, according to Tours, Marcowefa died shortly afterward, followed in the tomb by Charibert himself at the end of the year 567.

References 

   

6th-century births
6th-century deaths
6th-century Frankish women
Frankish queens consort
Merovingian dynasty